Gerald Cornelius Whalen (April 23, 1928 – November 1973) was an American football player who played at the center, guard, and tackle positions. He played college football for Canisius and professional football for the Buffalo Bills and Toronto Argonauts.

Early years
Whalen was born in 1928 in Buffalo, New York. He attended and played football at Canisius High School in Buffalo, New York.

College football
He played college football at Canisius in 1947.

Professional football
Although he had two years of college eligibility remaining, the Buffalo Bills of the All-America Football Conference (AAFC) received permission from the league commissioner in July 1948 to sign Whalen. Whalen played for the Bills during the 1948 season. He appeared in seven games with the Bills. He also played in the Canadian Football League for the Toronto Argonauts during the 1949 season. He appeared in 12 games with the Argonauts.

Family and later years
He died in 1973 at age 45 in Buffalo, New York. He was survived by wife Marion Lazickas, daughters Debra and Sandra, and twin sons Gerald and James.

References

1928 births
1973 deaths
Buffalo Bills (AAFC) players
Canisius Golden Griffins football players
Players of American football from Buffalo, New York
American football centers